Thomas Jude Frawley (born 1949) was a health service executive and ombudsman, notable for his early appointment as a senior officer of one of the health boards of Northern Ireland.

Life
Thomas Frawley was born in Limerick in 1949.  His family then moved to Belfast where he studied at St. Mary's Christian Brothers' Grammar School, Belfast.  He then attended Trinity College Dublin.

He worked for several health authorities before being appointed Chief Administrative Officer of the Western Health and Social Services Board based in Derry at the early age of 31 years.

He was appointed Northern Ireland Ombudsman, a post which he held for twenty years. He was elected Vice President of the World Board of the International Ombudsman Institute.  He was Vice Chair of the Northern Ireland Policing Board.

Recognition
In 2003, he was awarded an honorary doctorate (D.Univ) and then a Visiting Professorship by Ulster University.  In 2008 he was appointed a CBE for his contribution to public service in Northern Ireland.

References

1949 births
Living people
People educated at St. Mary's Christian Brothers' Grammar School, Belfast
Alumni of Trinity College Dublin
Civil servants from Belfast